The NX Draw (sometimes colloquially known the "Annie Bridge") is an out-of-service railroad bridge on the Passaic River between Newark and Kearny, New Jersey. The bascule bridge (sometimes called a jackknife bridge), built by the Erie Railroad and once part of its Newark Branch, has been abandoned in the raised position.

History
Rail service across the river was generally oriented to bringing passengers and freight from the points west over the Hackensack Meadows to Bergen Hill, where tunnels and cuts provided access to rail terminals on the Hudson River. The NX is the third bridge to cross the river at its location, the first having been built in 1871.

Post Erie era
The bridge was built as a double-track structure, but after the elimination of commuter train service it was changed to have only a single track in service. Freight train service continued through the creation of Conrail in 1976, but the bridge was taken out of service by Conrail in November 1977. It has been locked in the raised (open) position ever since. The bridge is located within the North Jersey Shared Assets Area and is assigned to Norfolk Southern Railway. Conrail continued to serve both sides of the branch with local freight train service until 2002, when the eastern side of the branch was removed from active service, partly due to the loss of the last shipper on the branch, SparTech Poly-Com.   A three-track trestle bridge over Passaic Avenue, just east of the NX bridge was removed in the mid-2000s to increase roadway clearance. On the west bank of the Passaic River, the Newark Industrial Track is still an active freight line serving several industries in the Newark area.

In 1982, the bridge was used in the filming of the movie Annie. It was left in its open position during the filming, though the structure itself was painted black, and the rails were painted silver. It has since become nicknamed the "Annie Bridge". Since the filming, the bridge has received no maintenance.

See also
Timeline of Jersey City area railroads
List of crossings of the Lower Passaic River
List of bridges, tunnels, and cuts in Hudson County, New Jersey
List of bridges documented by the Historic American Engineering Record in New Jersey

References

External links
Abandoned Railroad Drawbridge
Erie Railroad
Historic American Engineering Record documentation:
 (previous bridge)
 (current bridge)
Scene from Annie
Yearly update on Erie-Lackawanna Passenger Service

Bascule bridges in the United States
Erie Railroad bridges
Historic American Engineering Record in New Jersey
Railroad bridges in New Jersey
Bridges over the Passaic River
Bridges in Newark, New Jersey
Bridges in Hudson County, New Jersey
Kearny, New Jersey
Bridges completed in 1922